Oberea compta is a species of longhorn beetle in the tribe Saperdini in the genus Oberea, discovered by Pascoe in 1867.

References

C
Beetles described in 1867